CEERS-93316 is a candidate high-redshift galaxy, with an estimated redshift of approximately z = 16.4, corresponding to 236 million years after the Big Bang. If confirmed, it would be one of the earliest and most distant known galaxies observed.

CEERS-93316 would have a light-travel distance (lookback time) of 13.7 billion years, and, due to the expansion of the universe, a present proper distance of 34.9 billion light-years.

Discovery
The candidate high-redshift galaxy CEERS-93316 (RA:14:19:39.48 DEC:+52:56:34.92), in the Boötes constellation, was discovered by the CEERS imaging observing program using the Near Infrared Camera of the James Webb Space Telescope (JWST) in July 2022. CEERS stands for "Cosmic Evolution Early Release Science Survey", and is a deep- and wide-field sky survey program developed specifically for JWST image studies, and is conducted by the CEERS Collaboration. The galaxy's redshift was initially reported as z = 16.7 before it was revised down to z = 16.4 in October 2022.

According to astronomer Dr. Rebecca Bowler, a co-author of the discovery study, “Finding a z = 16.7 [sic] galaxy candidate is an amazing feeling – it wasn’t something we were expecting from the early data ... After the Big Bang the Universe entered a period known as the dark ages, a time before any stars had been born ... The observations of [CEERS-93316] push observations back to the time when we think the first galaxies ever to exist were being formed.  Already we’ve found more galaxies in the very early Universe than computer simulations predicted, so there is clearly a lot of open questions about how and when the first stars and galaxies formed.”

Distance
Only a photometric redshift has been determined for CEERS-93316; follow-up spectroscopic measurements will be required to confirm the redshift (see spectroscopic redshift). Spectroscopy could also determine the chemical composition, size and temperature of the galaxy.

Its existence in the early universe indicates that it is composed primarily of dust as well as stars, most likely population III, which are very young and massive. It is also in the star formation phase.

See also

 Earliest galaxies
 F200DB-045
 GLASS-z12
 HD1 (galaxy)
 JADES-GS-z13-0
 List of the most distant astronomical objects
 Peekaboo Galaxy

References

External links
 CEERS WebSite
 IMAGE: CEERS-93316 galaxy (1 Aug 2022)
 
 

Astronomical objects discovered in 2022
Boötes
Galaxies
James Webb Space Telescope